Isle of Springs is an island community in the town of Boothbay Harbor, Lincoln County, Maine, United States. The community was established in 1887 as a summer resort.

References

Villages in Lincoln County, Maine
Villages in Maine
1887 establishments in Maine
Populated places established in 1887